Princess Nicotine; or, The Smoke Fairy is a 1909 five-minute silent film directed by J. Stuart Blackton.

In the film, a smoker (Paul Panzer) falls asleep and is visited by two fairies (one of which is played by Gladys Hulette). Audiences marveled at the special effects featuring the fairies interacting with objects much larger than themselves.

Princess Nicotine; or, The Smoke Fairy was the first instance of tobacco product placement (for Sweet Corporal cigarettes and cigars) in the movies.

In 2003, it was among the 25 films added to the Library of Congress National Film Registry for being "culturally, historically or aesthetically significant."

Production 
The film was produced and most likely directed by J. Stuart Blackton, an illustrator and one of the most important figures in early film history. Blackton specialized in "trick films" and sharpened his skill with early special effects making fake footage of the Spanish-American War and animated films. Princess Nicotine was shot by Tony Gaudio, who used mirrors to achieve a deep depth of field. The film was probably inspired by Émile Cohl's The Animated Matches (1908), which had previously featured stop-motion matches that appeared to move by themselves. Blackton and Gaudio also employed hidden wires, double exposures, giant props, and smoke to make the film appear magical and dreamlike. The film's special effects astonished audiences, and Scientific American dedicated an article to explaining how the film was made.

References

External links
Princess Nicotine; or, the Smoke Fairy essay  by Scott Simmon at National Film Registry

 
 Princess Nicotine; or, the Smoke Fairy essay by Daniel Eagan in America's Film Legacy: The Authoritative Guide to the Landmark Movies in the National Film Registry, A&C Black, 2010 , pages 18–19 

1909 films
United States National Film Registry films
American black-and-white films
American silent short films
Films about fairies and sprites
Films directed by J. Stuart Blackton
1900s fantasy films
Vitagraph Studios short films
Articles containing video clips
American fantasy films
1900s American films
Silent horror films